The Lee Steere Stakes is a Perth Racing Group 2 Australian Thoroughbred horse race held under weight for age conditions, for horses aged three years old and older, over a distance of 1400 metres at Ascot Racecourse, Perth in November. Prize money is A$250,000.

History

The event is named after Ernest Augustus Lee Steere, former chairman of the Western Australian Turf Club and owner of the champion Eurythmic.

In 2003 the race was run at Belmont Park Racecourse.

Between 1989 and 2000 the race was held in mid December. Prior to 1989 the race was scheduled during the Perth Cup Carnival held close to New Year's Day.

Name
 1893–1938 - The All Aged Stakes
 1939–2007 - Lee Steere Stakes
 2008 onwards - Waroa-Lee Steere Stakes

Grade
1893–1978 - Principal race
1979 onwards - Group 2

Distance
1893–1938 - 1 mile (~1600 metres)
1938–1971 - 7 furlongs (~1400 metres)
1972–1984 – 1400 metres
1985–1992 – 1500 metres
1993 onwards - 1400 metres

Winners

 2022 - Massimo
 2021 - Massimo
 2020 - Kay Cee
 2019 - Star Exhibit
 2018 - Gatting
 2017 - Silverstream
 2016 - Perfect Reflection
 2015 - Black Heart Bart
 2014 - Magnifisio
 2013 - Conservatorium
 2012 - Luckygray
 2011 - Ranger
 2010 - Famous Roman
 2009 - Idyllic Prince
 2008 - Marasco
 2007 - Grasspatch Girl
 2006 - Belle Bizarre
 2005 - Avenida Madero
 2004 - Ellicorsam
 2003 - Early Express
 2002 - Hardrada
 2001 - Tribula
 2000 - Umrum
 1999 - Slavonic
 1998 - Pennyweight Point
 1997 - Willoughby
 1996 - Bradson
 1995 - Century Blazer
 1994 - Jacks Or Better
 1993 - Wabasso
 1992 - Welcome Knight
 1991 - M'Lady's Jewel
 1990 - Mister Till
 1989 - Carry A Smile
 1988 - Sky Filou
 1987 - Denver Dame
 1986 - Fair Sir
 1985 - Concrete
 1984 - Coal Pak
 1983 - Argentine Gold
 1982 - Getting Closer
 1981 - Iko
 1980 - Scarlet Gem
 1979 - Asian Beau
 1978 - Romantic Dream
 1977 - Burgess Queen
 1976 - Detonator
 1976 - Sizzler
 1975 - Merry Heart
 1974 - Starglow
 1972 - Millefleurs
 1972 - La Trice
 1971 - La Trice
 1970 - Sherolythe
 1969 - Chemech
 1968 - Paper Cap
 1967 - Railway Boy
 1966 - Railway Boy
 1965 - Norval Boy
 1964 - All India
 1963 - Big Bob
 1962 - Big Bob
 1961 - First Orl
 1960 - Aquanita
 1959 - Young Filipino
 1958 - Ultramatic
 1957 - Mcharry
 1956 - Maniana
 1955 - Chestnut Lady
 1954 - Copper Beech
 1953 - Winker
 1952 - Letorna
 1950 - Fawzia
 1949 - St. Falcon
 1949 - Garawind
 1948 - Westralian
 1947 - Santheine
 1946 - Frangus
 1944 - Lord Treat
 1943 - Skyro
 1942 - Dear Brutus
 1941 - Azoth
 1939 - Winbyie
 1938 - Gay Gipsy
 1938 - Tetreen
 1936 - Cetotis
 1935 - Old Story
 1933 - Cetotis
 1932 - no race
 1931 - Einga
 1930 - Pure Blend
 1929 - Peggy Poet
 1927 - Kongoni
 1926 - Tich
 1925 - Egyptian Idol
 1924 - Honneur
 1923 - Lilypond
 1922 - Scorpius
 1921 - Easingwold
 1920 - Jolly Cosy
 1920 - Mistico
 1919 - Haud
 1917 - Bardeur
 1916 - Mistico
 1916 - High Rock
 1914 - Lucky Beggar
 1914 - Tom Castro
 1912 - Saturate
 1911 - Artesian
 1910 - Jolly Beggar
 1910 - Annapolis
 1908 - Lady Bobadil
 1907 - May King
 1907 - Enchanteur
 1905 - Lady Agnes
 1904 - Betsy Burke
 1904 - Fifeness
 1903 - Manlock
 1901 - Cardinal
 1901 - Reliance
 1900 - Tarquin
 1899 - Aqua
 1898 - Tarquin
 1897 - Tarquin
 1896 - Carbonate
 1895 - Scarpia
 1894 - Scarpia
 1893 - Scarpia

Note: The event has been raced several times in a calendar year because it was regularly scheduled during the Perth Cup Carnival which is held close to New Year's Day. Hence the event would sometimes be scheduled in late December.

See also

 List of Australian Group races
 Group races

References

Horse races in Australia
Open mile category horse races
Sport in Perth, Western Australia